Dunn Mabika Hove, also known as Paris Checherere (July 14, 1959 - February 27, 2007) was a Zimbabwean military intelligence officer who was one of the leaders of ZANLA, Robert Mugabe's guerrilla forces during the Rhodesian Bush War. A career soldier, in post-independence Zimbabwe, he went on to have a successful career in the Zimbabwe National Army, serving with distinction in UN and AU led peace keeping missions across Africa.

Personal life 
He was born in 1959 in Mberengwa district of the Midlands Province. Colonel Mabika Hove was educated up to Form 4 at Chegato High School in Mberengwa  together with the likes of Major General Trust Mugoba Chief-of-Staff (Administration) and Quartermaster of the Zimbabwe National Army. Other school mates include Misheck Zhou, Runesu Tofa, Phineas Makhurane, the late politician Byron Hove, Eleck Mashingaidze and the late MDC Secretary for Economic Affairs, Industry and Commerce Dr. Mfandaidza Hove.

Rhodesian Bush War/Second Chimurenga 
He joined the Rhodesian Bush War/Second Chimurenga in 1976 and was trained in Mozambique at as a ZANLA militant. It was during training in Mozambique that he adopted the war name of Paris Checherere. After joining the front as a medical officer, he rose through the ranks to become a detachment commander in the Gaza province which was led by General Constantine Chiwenga (who was first Commissar then Provincial Commander), the current commander of the Zimbabwe Defence Forces and Retired Brigadier General (Judge Advocate General) George Chiweshe (who was the Provincial Commissar), now Judge President of Zimbabwe. Other operational commanders in Gaza provinces include the late liberation hero Brigadier General Charles Tigwe Gumbo.

In 1977, as a medical officer, Cde Paris supported the late Brigadier General Dr Felix Muchemwa, Dr Herbert Ushewokunze and Dr Sydney Sekeramayi who were the doctors in charge at Chimoio camp. As recalled by the late Brig General Dr Muchemwa, Parirenyatwa Camp hospital was the medical centre for Chimoio. Cde Muchemwa with assistance from Cde Paris and others carried out surgical procedures in a mobile ambulance theatre. On morning of the Chimoio attack, Dr Muchemwa recalls, "Our mobile ambulance theatre was being manned by Cde Paris who I had asked to go and collect some diesel while I took a bath. As I started bathing, this was around 7:30am, I just heard a cracking sound...... As I was trying to put on my clothes, I saw a huge crowd of comrades pouring out from the base running towards nearby bushes. One of the comrades who had already passed me came back and said Cde Muchemwa manyai, manyai. I asked him what was wrong and he said hondo, hondo. I asked him what hondo?" 
. The ambush which the Rhodesian forces called operation Dingo resulted in more than 3,000 ZANLA deaths and 5,000 guerillas were wounded while only two government troops died and six were wounded.

By the end of 1978 there were about 11,000 ZANLA troops operating in Rhodesia  and over half of these had been deployed through Mocambique's Gaza Province into the South East area of Rhodesia known as 'The Russian Front', At the end of the Second Chimurenga or Rhodesian bush war, Paris Chererere joined many other ZANLA and ZAPU fighters at assembly points, ready to start life in a new Zimbabwe
Career in the Zimbabwe military

Integration 
In 1981 Paris Checherere was attested to the newly formed Zimbabwe National Army in the Corps of Intelligence. Following majority rule in April 1980 and the cantonment of the ZANLA and ZIPRA under Operation Agila, Lt General Solomon Mujuru with assistance from British Army trainers (the British Military Advisory and Training Team, BMATT) oversaw the integration of guerrilla fighters into one unified army.

Peacekeeping 

Col Mabika Hove was not a controversial military figure and he remained an apolitical during his professional career. This is partly why he was greatly admired by many in the Corps of Intelligence and the ZNA in general. Current commander of Zimbabwe National Army Lt. General Philip Valerio Sibanda characterised him as an intelligent, calm, firm but compassionate leader. He was especially known for being a diplomat par excellence and was involved in most of the Zimbabwe National Army's foreign peace keeping missions. Some of these include;

 Angolan Civil War; 1991-1995 United Nations Angola Verification Mission II (UNAVEM II) 
 Mozambican Civil War; 1992-1994 United Nations Operation in Mozambique (ONUMOZ) 
 Somali Civil War; 1992-1993 United Nations Operation in Somalia I (UNOSOM I) 
 Somali Civil War; 1993-1995 United Nations Operation in Somalia II (UNOSOM II) 
Democratic Republic of the Congo http://www.c-r.org/accord-article/role-united-nations-angolan-peace-process
In 1998, Col Mabika Hove was one of the advisors sent by Robert Mugabe to assist President Laurent Kabila as the Second Congo War, also known as Coltan War, or the Great War of Africa gained momentum. His main function was to strengthen the allied forces’ (Zambia, Chad, Sudan, Angola and Zimbabwe) intelligence capacity and he was dubbed “Chief Spy.” The war was not only the largest war in modern African history, but it was the deadliest conflict worldwide since World War II killing more than 5.4 million people. Col Mabika Hove was especially instrumental in the effort to establish stability in the aftermath of the assassination of Laurent-Désiré Kabila on 16 January 2001.

Later years 
He later returned home when the war officially ended in July 2003 to head the Zimbabwe's National Army's main School of Military Intelligence at Kabrit in Harare. He was later appointed director of the Ministry of Defence's Mapping and Research division (intelligence) and was subsequently seconded to the Ministry of Lands to provide security sector oversight on the land reform programme. Col Mabika Hove also benefited from the programme and was offered an uncontested lot of the Central Estates donated to government by businessman Nicholas van Hoogstraten.

Death 
Dunn Mabika Hove ‘‘Paris Checherere’’ died in the early hours of the morning of February 27, 2007 aged 47. He had throughout his military career, particularly the DRC war developed a number of ailments including diabetes and heart disease. He died in a diabetic coma in a private clinic in Craneborne, Harare. He was declared a Liberation War Hero and was buried at the heroes’ acre in Harare. 
He is survived by his wife, Grace and three children, Fidelis, Tinashe and Tsitsi.

References

Zimbabwean military personnel
Zimbabwean guerrillas
Zimbabwean military leaders
People from Midlands Province
1959 births
2007 deaths